Plopi is a commune in Cantemir District, Moldova. It is composed of four villages: Alexandrovca, Hîrtop, Plopi and Taraclia.

References

Communes of Cantemir District